Encompass Technologies is an American multinational enterprise resource planning software corporation, with headquarters in Fort Collins, Colorado. Encompass develops beverage distributing software for multiple distributors in the beverage industry. The company incorporates software products pertaining to WMS, voice-directed order picking, IOT-hardware offerings such as PFDex, ASI, Scale Controller, and Warehouse Control System. Encompass uses a web-based cloud system.

In 2020, Encompass merged with Orchestra Software and acquired Handoff to provide SaaS solutions with the entire supply chain of brewers, distilleries, distributors, and retailers.

The O'Neil family established Encompass Technologies by late 2001.

Encompass became the first cloud-based warehouse management system in 2011.

January 2015, the Fort Collins headquarters transferred to the completed location at 420 Linden st. The location is shared with upstairs apartments and is estimated to generate $1.2 million in additional tax revenue for Fort Collins through 2031.

In October 2020, Encompass Technologies merged with Orchestra Software, a Portland, Oregon-based software and services solution for the craft beverage industry. In November 2020, Encompass acquired Handoff, a Denver-based alcohol delivery startup that serves retailers.

Encompass offers route accounting software designed for beverage distributors which helps in the dispatch, delivery, accounting, invoicing, billing, and return of products from delivery and service vehicles. They also offer the Route Accounting Software, a software application designed to support and optimize warehouse functionality and distribution center management.

References

Software companies based in Colorado
Companies established in 2001
Software companies of the United States